St. Mira's College for Girls, also known as St. Mira's College, is an undergraduate and postgraduate women's college situated near Koregaon Park, Pune, Maharashtra established in 1962. The college is affiliated with Pune University.

Academics
St. Mira's College  offers different courses in arts, commerce and science at the junior college level, as well as undergraduate and postgraduate degrees.

Junior College

Arts
Commerce
Science

Undergraduate

B.A
B.Com
B.Sc(Computer Science)
B.C.A
B.B.A

Post Graduate

M.A
M.Com

Accreditation
The college is  recognized by the University Grants Commission (UGC).

References

External links

Universities and colleges in Pune
Educational institutions established in 1962
1962 establishments in Maharashtra